Transformative Media LLC was founded in 2014 by Andrew Kriss and Eric Lerner as a digital production company. They served as executive producers, advisors, and business development consultants to Pulse Evolution Corporation, a human animation company known for its creation of the Michael Jackson hologram performance at the 2014 Billboard Music Awards. On August 26, 2014, Pulse formed a partnership with the estate of Elvis Presley to develop a virtual "King of Rock 'n' Roll."

References

2014 establishments in the United States
American companies established in 2014
Holography industry